Kiwaia is a genus of moths in the family Gelechiidae. Two subgenera are currently recognised, (i) the nominotypical subgenus with 25 species from New Zealand, and (ii) subgenus Empista with 4 species from the Palaearctic Region.

Species
Subgenus Kiwaia
 Kiwaia aerobatis (Meyrick, 1924)
 Kiwaia brontophora (Meyrick, 1886)
 Kiwaia caerulea (Hudson, 1925)
 Kiwaia calaspidea (Clarke, 1934)
 Kiwaia cheradias (Meyrick, 1909)
 Kiwaia contraria (Philpott, 1930)
 Kiwaia dividua (Philpott, 1921)
 Kiwaia eurybathra (Meyrick, 1931)
 Kiwaia glaucoterma (Meyrick, 1911)
 Kiwaia heterospora (Meyrick, 1924)
 Kiwaia hippeis (Meyrick, 1901)
 Kiwaia jeanae Philpott, 1930
 Kiwaia lapillosa (Meyrick, 1924)
 Kiwaia lenis (Philpott, 1929)
 Kiwaia lithodes (Meyrick, 1886)
 Kiwaia matermea (Povolný, 1974)
 Kiwaia monophragma (Meyrick, 1886)
 Kiwaia neglecta (Philpott, 1924)
 Kiwaia parapleura (Meyrick, 1886)
 Kiwaia parvula (Philpott, 1930)
 Kiwaia pharetria (Meyrick, 1886)
 Kiwaia plemochoa (Meyrick, 1916)
 Kiwaia pumila (Philpott, 1928)
 Kiwaia schematica (Meyrick, 1886)
 Kiwaia thyraula (Meyrick, 1886) [=Kiwaia quieta (Philpott, 1927)]

Subgenus Empista
 Kiwaia kostjuki Povolný, 2001
 Kiwaia kumatai (Povolný, 1976)
 Kiwaia palaearctica (Povolný, 1968)
 Kiwaia spinosa (Povolný, 1976)

References

 
Gnorimoschemini
Moth genera